The southern even-fingered gecko (Alsophylax laevis) is a species of gecko found in Turkmenistan, Uzbekistan, Iran and Afghanistan.

References

Alsophylax
Reptiles described in 1907
Taxa named by Alexander Nikolsky